Glauber Gomes dos Santos (born 25 June 1996), commonly known as Glauber, is a Brazilian professional footballer currently playing as a defender for Albanian side Butrinti.

Career statistics

Club
.

Notes

References

1996 births
Living people
Footballers from Brasília
Brazilian footballers
Association football defenders
Kategoria e Parë players
Brazilian expatriate footballers
Brazilian expatriate sportspeople in Albania
Expatriate footballers in Albania
KF Butrinti players